Sascha Jusufi (born Saša Jusufi, on 20 January 1963) is a retired German football player.

His father is Partizan Belgrade legend Fahrudin Jusufi.

Honours
 DFB-Pokal: 1986–87
 Bundesliga: runner-up 1986–87

References

1963 births
Living people
Gorani people
German footballers
German people of Serbian descent
KFC Uerdingen 05 players
1. FC Saarbrücken players
Hamburger SV players
FC Schalke 04 players
Bundesliga players
2. Bundesliga players
Yugoslav emigrants to West Germany
Footballers from Belgrade

Association football midfielders
German people of Kosovan descent
West German footballers